Dame Janice Mesadis Pereira ( George; formerly: George-Creque, Creque) , is the Chief Justice of the Eastern Caribbean Supreme Court. She became the first female Chief Justice and the first person from the British Virgin Islands to become Chief Justice in 2012.

Early life 
She was originally called to the Bar of the British Virgin Islands in 1981, and became a High Court judge in 2003.  She was promoted to the Court of Appeal on 9 January 2009 before being appointed to the Chief Justice in 2012.

As Chief Justice of the Court, she is the supreme judicial officer of the courts of Anguilla, Antigua and Barbuda, the British Virgin Islands, Dominica, Grenada, Montserrat, Saint Kitts and Nevis, Saint Lucia, and Saint Vincent and the Grenadines. She was created a Dame Commander of the Order of the British Empire (DBE) in 2013.

Supervisor of elections
Prior to joining the judiciary, as a practising lawyer Janice Pereira twice acted as supervisor for elections in the British Virgin Islands in the 1983 general election (under her maiden name) and in the 1986 general election (under her first married name, Janice George-Creque).

References

Living people
British women judges
British Virgin Islands judges on the courts of Anguilla
British Virgin Islands judges on the courts of Antigua and Barbuda
British Virgin Islands judges on the courts of Dominica
British Virgin Islands judges on the courts of Grenada
British Virgin Islands judges on the courts of Saint Kitts and Nevis
British Virgin Islands judges on the courts of Montserrat
British Virgin Islands judges on the courts of Saint Vincent and the Grenadines
British Virgin Islands judges on the courts of Saint Lucia
20th-century British Virgin Islands lawyers
British Virgin Islands judges
Chief justices of the Eastern Caribbean Supreme Court
Dames Commander of the Order of the British Empire
University of the West Indies alumni
Women chief justices
Year of birth missing (living people)
People from Virgin Gorda
British judges of international courts and tribunals